Michael Butler may refer to:
Michael Butler (computer scientist), professor of computer science at the University of Southampton, UK
Sir Michael Butler (diplomat) (1927–2013), former British ambassador to the EEC
Michael Butler (musician) (born 1961), musician and podcaster
Michael Butler (politician), Canadian politician
Michael Butler (producer) (1926–2022), American theatrical producer
Michael Butler (soccer) (born 1976), Liberian retired professional soccer player
Michael E. Butler (1855–1926), American politician from New York
Mick Butler (Dublin hurler) (1916–1987), Irish hurling player
Mick Butler (footballer) (born 1951), English footballer
Mick Butler (Wexford hurler) (born 1950), Irish retired hurler
Mike Butler (American football) (born 1954), former American football defensive end
Mike Butler (basketball) (born 1946), American former professional basketball player